The 2022–23 Liga IV is the 81st season of the Liga IV, the fourth tier of the Romanian football league system. The champions of each county association play against one from a neighboring county in a play-off to gain promotion to 2023–24 Liga III.

Promotion play-off 

|-
|colspan="3" style="background-color:#97DEFF"|Region 1 (North-East)
|colspan="2" style="background-color:#97DEFF"|
||–||–
||–||–
||–||–
|-
|colspan="3" style="background-color:#97DEFF"|Region 2 (North-West)
|colspan="2" style="background-color:#97DEFF"|
||–||–
||–||–
||–||–
|-
|colspan="3" style="background-color:#97DEFF"|Region 3 (Center)
|colspan="2" style="background-color:#97DEFF"|
||–||–
||–||–
||–||–
|-
|colspan="3" style="background-color:#97DEFF"|Region 4 (West)
|colspan="2" style="background-color:#97DEFF"|
||–||–
||–||–
||–||–
|-
|colspan="3" style="background-color:#97DEFF"|Region 5 (South-West)
|colspan="2" style="background-color:#97DEFF"|
||–||–
||–||–
||–||–
|-
|colspan="3" style="background-color:#97DEFF"|Region 6 (South)
|colspan="2" style="background-color:#97DEFF"|
||–||–
||–||–
||–||–
|-
|colspan="3" style="background-color:#97DEFF"|Region 7 (South-East)
|colspan="2" style="background-color:#97DEFF"|
||–||–
||–||–
||–||–
|}

County leagues

Alba County

Arad County

Argeș County

Bacău County 
 Seria 1

Seria 2 

Championship play-off 
The first two teams in each series of the regular season will meet twice (six matches per team). The teams start the Championship play-off with the points from the regular season accumulated with the teams ranked 1-9.
 Relegation play-out 
The teams ranked 8th will play with the teams ranked 9th in the other series in a one leg relegation play-out match.

Bihor County 
The regular season played in a single round-robin tournament, then followed a promotion play-off and a relegation play-out.
Seria 1 (North)

Seria 2 (South)

Championship play-off 
The Championship play-off will be played between the first four teams from each series of the regular season in a double round-robin tournament.

Relegation play-out 
The teams ranked 5-11, respectively 5-10 will played in the play-out in a double round-robin tournament. Despite the play-off tournament, in the play-out groups, the teams will start with the points obtained in the regular season.
Seria 1 (North)

Seria 2 (South)

Bistrița-Năsăud County 
South Series

North Series

Championship play-off

Botoșani County

Brașov County 

Championship play-off 
The Championship play-off will be played between the first six teams of the regular season in a double round-robin tournament.
Championship play-out 
The Championship play-out will be played between the last fourteams of the regular season in a double round-robin tournament.

Brăila County 

Championship play-off 
In the championship play-off each team plays every other team twice. Teams start the play-off round with their points from the Regular season halved, rounded upwards, and no other records carried over from the Regular season.
Championship play-out 
In the championship play-out each team plays every other team twice. Teams start the play-out round with their points from the Regular season halved, rounded upwards, and no other records carried over from the Regular season.

Bucharest 

Championship play-off 
Championship play-off played in a single round-robin tournament between the best four teams of the regular season. Depending on the place occupied in the Regular season, the teams started the play-off with the following points: 1st place – 3 points, 2nd place – 2 points, 3rd place – 1 point, 4th place – 0 points.

Buzău County

Caraș-Severin County

Călărași County 
Seria A

Seria B

Championship play-off 
The teams started the play-off with all the records from the Regular season.
Seria A 
Seria B 
Relegation play-out 
The teams started the play-out with all the records from the Regular season.
Seria A 
Seria B 
Championship final

Cluj County

Constanța County

Covasna County

Dâmbovița County

Dolj County

Galați County

Giurgiu County 
South Series

North Series

Championship play-off 
The championship play-off will be played between the best two ranked teams in each series of the Regular season.
Semi-finals

Final

Gorj County

Harghita County

Hunedoara County 

Championship play-off
Final four 
The final four will be played in a double round-robin tournament between the best four teams of the regular season. The teams started the final four play-off with half of the points accumulated in the regular season.
5–11 place play-off 
The 5–11 place play-off will be played in a single round-robin tournament between the last seven teams of the regular season. The teams started the play-off with half of the points accumulated in the regular season.

Ialomița County 
East Series 

 West Series

Championship play-off 
The Championship play-off will be played in a single round-robin tournament between the best four teams of each series of the regular season.

Iași County

Ilfov County 
Seria 1

Seria 2

Championship play-off 
The Championship play-off will be played between the first two teams from each series of the regular season. The semi-finals and the final would be played in a double-leg format.
Semi-finals

||–||–
||–||–

Final

||–||–

Maramureș County 
South Series

 North Series

Final four 
Semi-finals

||–||–
||–||–

Final

Mehedinți County 
Each team plays every other team once, then follows the championship play-off and the championship play-out.

Championship play-off 
The championship play-off  will be played in a double round-robin tournament between the best 6 teams (after 13 rounds).
Championship play-out 
The championship play-out  will be played in a single round-robin tournament between the last 8 teams (after 13 rounds).

Mureș County

Neamț County

Olt County

Prahova County

Satu Mare County 
Series A

Series B

Championship play-off 
The Championship play-off will be played in a single round-robin tournament between the best four teams from each series of the regular season. Teams will start the play-off with the following points: 1st place – 3 points, 2nd place – 2 points, 3rd place – 1 point, 4th place – 0 points.

Relegation play-out 
The Relegation play-out will be played in a single round-robin tournament between the last four teams from each series of the regular season. Teams will start the play-out with the following points: 5th place – 3 points, 6th place – 2 points, 7th place – 1 point, 8th place – 0 points.

Sălaj County

Sibiu County

Suceava County

Teleorman County

Timiș County

Tulcea County

Vaslui County 

 Relegation play-out 
The 9th and 10th-placed teams of the Liga IV faces the 3rd and 4th-placed team of the Liga V Vaslui – County.

||–||–
||–||–
|}

Vâlcea County

Vrancea County

See also
 2022–23 Liga I
 2022–23 Liga II
 2022–23 Liga III

References

External links
 FRF
 frf-ajf.ro

Liga IV seasons
4
Romania